Botswana has low incidence of marriages of children overall but the practice is reported to be a major issue among the Basarwa, Zezuru, parts of the Kgalagadi communities and in North Western Botswana. There is little information available on the issue.

Botswana Marriage Act
Registration of marriages of religious and customary marriages.
Increased the age of marriage to 21 without consent.
Persons below the age of 18 can only marriage with the consent of parents.

References 

Botswana
Childhood in Botswana
Women in Botswana
History of women in Botswana
Marriage in Africa